List of the National Register of Historic Places listings in Herkimer County, New York

This is intended to be a complete list of properties and districts listed on the National Register of Historic Places in Herkimer County, New York.  The locations of National Register properties and districts (at least for all showing latitude and longitude coordinates below) may be seen in a map by clicking on "Map of all coordinates".  Two districts are further designated a National Historic Landmark (NHL), and part of the county is included in the Adirondack Forest Preserve, another NHL.



Listings county-wide

|}

See also

National Register of Historic Places listings in New York

References

Herkimer County
Herkimer County, New York